William Servat (born 9 December 1978 in Saint-Gaudens, France) is a former French rugby union footballer and is currently an assistant coach for the France national team. Servat played as a hooker for Toulouse in the Top 14 club competition and for France at international level.

Career

Club career
Born in Saint-Gaudens in the Haute-Garonne département of France, Servat began his rugby career at his local club, Mazères-Cassagne. He played for Mazères-Cassagne until 1998, when he was signed by Toulouse. In his first season at Toulouse, Servat helped the club to their fifth Top 14 title in six years. He has since been involved with just one more Top 14 title victory (in 2001), but he has helped the club to three Heineken Cup titles in 2002–03, playing as a replacement in the final, and starting in the 2004–05 and 2009-10 finals.

International career

Servat made his debut for the France national team on 14 February 2004 in a 35–17 victory over Ireland in the 2004 Six Nations Championship. That year, France won the Six Nations Grand Slam, by beating every other team in the competition, with Servat playing in every game. The following year, France came second in the Six Nations, finishing as runners-up to Wales. Servat only made one start in the 2005 tournament, but made three substitute appearances as well. Servat has now retired.

Servat was a playing member of the French 2011 Rugby World Cup squad that eventually lost 8-7 to hosts New Zealand in the final.

Coaching career
On 15 February 2012, Servat announced that he had accepted an offer to become the forwards coach at Toulouse, effective with the 2012–13 season. The position was opened up when incumbent Yannick Bru agreed to join the staff of the France national team under Philippe Saint-André after the 2011–12 season.

Servat followed suite in 2019 and took up the post of forwards coach for the France national team under head coach Fabien Galthié

Honours

Club

Toulouse (1998–present)
Top 14
Winner: 1999, 2001, 2008, 2011, 2012
Runner-up: 2003, 2006
Heineken Cup
Winner: 2003, 2005, 2010
Runner-up: 2004, 2008

International
Six Nations
Winner: 2004, 2010
Runner-up: 2005
World Cup
Runner-up: 2011

References

External links
Profile at ESPNscrum.com

1978 births
Living people
French rugby union coaches
French rugby union players
Rugby union hookers
France international rugby union players
Stade Toulousain players
People from Saint-Gaudens, Haute-Garonne
Sportspeople from Haute-Garonne